Paula Conrad-Schlenther (née Conrad; 27 February 1860 – 9 August 1938) was an Austrian-German stage actress.

Life 
Paula Conrad made her debut in 1877 in Baden bei Wien. From 1877 she was a member of the ensemble at the Königlichen Schauspielhaus in Berlin. She played Hannele in the 1983 world premiere of Gerhart Hauptmann's Hanneles Himmelfahrt. Alfred Kerr recalls the premiere three decades later, admiring Conrad and stating "blieb sie in jedem Sinn die erste" ("she remained in every sense the first").

In 1892, Conrad married Paul Schlenther, the theater critic of the Vossische Zeitung and later director of the Vienna Burgtheater, and she worked for him in Vienna from 1898 to 1910, after which she returned to the Schauspielhaus Berlin, remaining there until 1932. Conrad was primarily a performer of Hauptmann's works, playing roles such as Frau Flamm in Rose Bernd at its 1903 premiere and Aase in Henrik Ibsen's Peer Gynt. She also shortly appeared in silent films. Her grave is located at Berlin's Urnenfriedhof Gerichtstraße, an urn cemetery.

Filmography 

 1920: Die Verschleierte
 1921: Die Furcht vor dem Weibe
 1923: Der verlorene Schuh
 1924: Mein Leopold

References

Further reading 

 Renate Hoyer: Paula Conrad-Schlenther: 1860-1938; vierzig Jahre Tätigkeit am Königlichen Schauspielhaus in Berlin, Berlin, Colloquium-Verlag, 1971. 160 pp.
 C. Bernd Sucher (Hrsg.): Theaterlexikon. Autoren, Regisseure, Schauspieler, Dramaturgen, Bühnenbildner, Kritiker. By Christine Dössel and Marietta Piekenbrock with the assistance of Jean-Claude Kuner and C. Bernd Sucher. 2nd edition. Deutscher Taschenbuch-Verlag, Munich 1999, ISBN 3-423-03322-3, p. 121 f.

External links 

 
 Paula Conrad at filmportal.de

1860 births
1938 deaths
Austrian stage actresses
German stage actresses
Actresses from Vienna